The Figari Reservoir is a reservoir in the Corse-du-Sud department of France on the island of Corsica.
It provides water for irrigation and human consumption.

Location

The Figari Reservoir is in the commune of Figari near the south coast of Corsica.
It is southeast of the village of Figari.
It is formed by a dam, the Barrage de Figari, that impounds the Ruisseau de Ventilegne.
The reservoir supplies water for human consumption and for irrigation to the communes of Bonifacio, Figari, Pianottoli-Caldarello and Monacia-d'Aullène.

Dam

The dam came into service in 1993 and is operated by the Office d’Equipement Hydraulique de Corse (OEHC).
It holds  of water.

Developments

In December 2002 it was reported that the Agence de l'eau Rhône-Méditerranée-Corse had provided up to 600,000 euros to the OEHC so it could install a water intake on the Orgone river from which it could supply additional water to the Figari reservoir.
Implementation was planned for the fall of 2003.

In 2018 the OEHC scheduled work to renew the  steel pipeline downstream from the Figari dam and to replace a defective  valve in the pumping station.
As of 2019 the OEHC was planning substantial upgrades to the spillway so it could handle a 10,000 year flood.
There were also considering a hydroelectric power plant on the filling pipe of the reservoir, and considering floating solar panels.

Plans also included building a dam on the Cavu to store  of water.

Notes

Sources

Reservoirs of Corsica